Khonesavanh Sihavong (born 10 October 1994) is a Laotian footballer, who plays for Hoang Anh Attapeu F.C. He played for Laos national football team at the 2012 AFF Suzuki Cup.

International

International goals
As of match played 7 June 2016. Laos score listed first, score column indicates score after each Sihavong goal.

References

External links

1994 births
Living people
Laotian footballers
Footballers at the 2014 Asian Games
Laos international footballers
Association football midfielders
Asian Games competitors for Laos